Engineers and Geoscientists British Columbia (EGBC), officially known as the Association of Professional Engineers and Geoscientists of the Province of British Columbia (APEGBC). EGBC regulates and governs professional engineers and professional geoscientists in the Province of British Columbia, Canada under the authority of the Professional Governance Act.

With over 38,000 registrants, Engineers and Geoscientists BC is one of the largest regulatory bodies in British Columbia. Individuals licensed by EGBC are the only persons permitted by law to undertake and assume responsibility for engineering and geoscience projects in the province of BC. Engineers and Geoscientists BC is a constituent member of Engineers Canada.

History

Following second collapse of the Quebec Bridge in 1919, provinces throughout Canada began regulating Engineers through legislation. The Engineering Profession Act of 1920 created the Association of Professional Engineers of the Province of British Columbia to regulate and license professional engineers. In 1990, geoscience became a regulated profession in British Columbia, and the association was expanded to become The Association of Professional Engineers and Geoscientists of the Province of British Columbia.

On August 22, 2017, APEGBC rebranded as Engineers and Geoscientists British Columbia with a new logo to accompany the rebranding.

The organization is charged with protecting the public interest by setting and maintaining high academic, experience and professional practice standards for all registrants.

Organization
Engineers and Geoscientists BC is governed by a council of elected registrants and government appointees. Engineers and Geoscientists BC's Council is accountable to the public through the Ministry of the Attorney General, under the Office of the Superintendent of Professional Governance, for both the governance and management of the organization.

References

External links
 Official website

Engineering societies based in Canada
Professional associations based in British Columbia
Professional certification in engineering
Professional titles and certifications